The Bhil languages are a group of Indo-Aryan languages spoken by around 10.4 million Bhils in western and central India as of 2011. They constitute the primary languages of the southern Aravalli Range in Rajasthan and the western Satpura Range in Madhya Pradesh, northwestern Maharashtra, and southern Gujarat. According to the 52nd report of the commissioner for linguistic minorities in India, Ministry of Minority Affairs, Bhili is the most commonly spoken language of the district of Dadra and Nagar Haveli constituting 40.42% of its total population. Bhili speakers are also significant in the states of Gujarat (4.75%), Madhya Pradesh (4.93%) and Rajasthan (4.60%).

See also 

rathwi Bareli
Languages of India
Gujarati language
Gujarati people
Languages with official status in India
List of Indian languages by total speakers

Relationship 
The Bhil languages form a link midway between the Gujarati language and the Rajasthani–Marwari languages.

Grouped geographically, the Bhil languages are the following:

Northern Bhil
Bauria
Wagdi (perhaps central: reportedly highly intelligible with Adiwasa, Patelia, and other varieties of Bhil proper)
Bhilori (Noiri, Dungra)
Magari (Magra ki Boli; incl. under Bhili proper in Ethnologue)
Central Bhil
Bhili proper (Patelia), Bhilodi, Adiwasa & Rajput Garasia [mutually intelligible; some intelligible with Marwari]
Bhilali (Rathawi)
Chodri
Dhodia
Dhanki
Dubli
Eastern Bhil (Bareli)
Palya Bareli
Pauri Bareli
Rathwi Bareli
Pardhi
Kalto (Nahali)

Other Bhil languages include Gamit (Gamti) and Mawchi. Vasavi is spoken by ethnic Bhils, but may be closer to Gujarati. Similarly, Malvi and Nimadi may be closer to Rajasthani. The recently described Vaagri Booli may also be a Bhil language.

References

Further reading
 Khare, Randhir. "Dangs: Journeys Into The Heartland". New Delhi: Harper Collins Publishers India. 
 Khare, Randhir. "Flight Of Arrows". Selected Song Poems Of The Bhils.Pune:Grasswork Books
 Khare, Randhir. The Singing Bow: Song-Poems of the Bhil. New Delhi: HarperCollins Publishers India, 2001. 
 Varma, Siddheshwar. Bhil Dialects and Khandesi: A Linguistic Analysis. Panjab University Indological series, 23. Hoshiarpur: Vishveshvaranand Vishva Bandhu Institute of Sanskrit and Indological Studies, Panjab University, 1978.

Western Indo-Aryan languages
Languages of Rajasthan
Bhil
Languages of Gujarat
Languages of Madhya Pradesh
Languages of Maharashtra
Languages of Sindh
Languages of India